KMCA could refer to:

KMCA (defunct), a defunct radio station in Redding, California, USA
KMCA-LD, a television station (channel 10) licensed to Redding, California
Korea Music Content Association
 Russian puppet governments in Ukraine:
Kharkiv military-civilian administration
Kherson military-civilian administration